Tadeusz Płoski D.Sc., Ph.D. (9 March 1956 – 10 April 2010) was a Polish military bishop and Major General. He was born in Lidzbark Warmiński.

He was appointed the Military Ordinary of the Polish Armed Forces, by Pope John Paul II on 16 October 2004. He was ordained a bishop on 30 October 2004. In this role he oversaw the spiritual needs and priests attached to the Polish Forces.

He was listed on the flight manifest of the Tupolev Tu-154 of the 36th Special Aviation Regiment carrying the President of Poland Lech Kaczyński which crashed near Smolensk-North airport near Pechersk near Smolensk, Russia, on 10 April 2010, killing all aboard.

In 2017 it was revealed that when the Polish state reopened the investigation into the crash and exhumed victim's bodies, testing revealed that Archbishop Miron Chodakowski's coffin contained his body from the waist up and the body of Ploski from the waist down. Only half of Ploski's body was found in his own coffin.

Military Promotions
 Captain - 1992 
 Major - 1995 
 Lieutenant Colonel - 1998 
 Colonel - 2000
 Brigadier General - 2004 
 Major General - 2006

Honours and awards
 Commander's Cross of the Order of Polonia Restituta - 2010, posthumously; previously awarded the Knight's Cross - 2008
 Gold Cross of Merit - 2007
 Silver Cross of Merit - 1999
 Bronze Medal in the Service of the Armed Forces of the Homeland
 Silver Medal for his contribution to national defence
 Gold Medal of Merit for the Police
 Gold Badge of Merit for the Customs Service - 2010, posthumously
 Commander Missio Reconciliationis
 Medal Pro Memoria
 Badge of Honour "for outstanding services to the League of National Defense"
 Knights of the Order of Virtuti Militari
 Badge "for his contribution to the National Union of Soldiers, Peasants' Battalions"
 Honorary Badge of the Organizational of Merit of the Republic of Pilsudski Polish Association" - 2009
 Grand Officer of the Order of Merit - 2008, Portugal
 Cross of Honour of the Scouting Association of the Republic of Poland - AD amīcum - 2010, posthumously
 Award of Merit for the City of Warsaw - 2010, posthumously

References

1956 births
2010 deaths
People from Lidzbark Warmiński
21st-century Roman Catholic bishops in Poland
Polish generals
Commanders of the Order of Polonia Restituta
Recipients of the Cross of Merit (Poland)
Knights of the Virtuti Militari
Grand Officers of the Order of Merit (Portugal)
Victims of the Smolensk air disaster